Richard M. Ehrlich is a surgeon and photographer. Born in New York City on March 12, 1938, he obtained a BA in 1959 from Cornell University, where he was a member of the Quill and Dagger society. He has been a professor and physician for over 40 years, and has been recognized as a fine art photographer. The New York Times said his photographs "suggest ephemerality from a broader historical perspective" and that they "look like staged fantasies".

Career
In 1963, he obtained his medical degree from Cornell University Medical College, with an internship and surgical residency at the New York Hospital-Cornell Medical Center followed by a residency in urology at Columbia Presbyterian Medical Center from 1965–1969. He served as a Major in the United States Air Force from 1969–1971.

He held a research Fellowship at the National Institute of Health sponsored by Columbia University in 1966-67 and a Senior Research Fellowship in 1969. He was admitted as a Fellow to the American College of Surgeons in 1974.

Ehrlich held multiple teaching positions at the University of California School of Medicine from 1971, becoming a Professor Emeritus of Urology in 2012. He is certified by the National Board of Medical Examiners and the American Board of Urology.

He served as President of both the Society for Pediatric Urology in 1991 and American Academy of Pediatrics-Urology Section in 1993, and was elected to membership in the American Association of Genitourinary Surgeons in 1982.

Photography
Ehrlich is a professional fine art photographer whose photographs are held in permanent collections of multiple museums, including:
 J. Paul Getty Museum
Smithsonian National Museum of American History
 Los Angeles County Museum of Art
 UCLA Hammer Museum
 The George Eastman Museum
 Denver Art Museum
 Santa Barbara Museum of Art
 United States Holocaust Memorial Museum
 Yad Vashem in Jerusalem
 Jewish Museum in New York City
 Jewish Museum, Berlin
 Musée d'Art et d'Histoire du Judaïsme, Paris
 Charles E. Young Research Library at University of California, Los Angeles
 University of Southern California Shoah Foundation
 Herbert F. Johnson Museum of Art, Cornell University, Ithaca.
Houston Museum of Fine Arts
Museum of the City of New York

His Holocaust Archives Series consists of photographs taken of the records of the International Tracing Service (ITS) in Bad Arolsen, Germany, an archival center that houses sources for identifying and tracing the victims of the Holocaust. He was the first to gain permission to photograph these archives. The series was shown at the Craig Krull Gallery in Los Angeles in 2008, University at Buffalo, New York in 2009, and UCLA in 2010, and was the subject of an LA Times article.

The Grammy Museum is featuring Ehrlich's Face the Music exhibition. Expanding on the content of his 2015 photography book of the same title, it is the product of a five-year collaboration with a number of prominent musicians.

As a photographer, he has published nine books and two portfolios including Namibia: The Forbidden Zone, Anatomia Digitale, The Other Side of the Sky, Reverie, Face the Music, Faces of Promise and Neogenesis. Decoding Mimbres Painting, for which he was a photographer, was named among the Best Art Books of 2018 by the New York Times.

In 2012 he delivered a lecture at Annenberg Space for Photography as part of the Iris Nights Lecture Series.

Philanthropy 
Ehrlich is president of Richard Ehrlich Family Foundation, a not-for-profit public charity under IRC Section 501(c)3 based in Malibu, CA. Beginning in 2016, the Foundation has facilitated a series of exhibitions compiling the works of Robert Frank, Robert Frank: Books and Films, 1947 - 2017, produced by Steidl. The exhibit has been shown at Tisch School of the Arts, at New York University, University of California, Los Angeles in collaboration with Bergamot Station, University of California, Berkeley, The Tisch Library at Tufts University, Houston Center for Photography and Blue Sky Gallery in Portland, Oregon.

This 2019 RoseGallery exhibition, 27 Miles: Abstract Truth documenting the 2018 Woolsey fire, was presented to raise awareness and support for the California Community Foundation's Wildfire Relief Fund.

Selected publications

Medical articles
Smith, R.B., et al. "Bilateral renal cell carcinoma and renal cell carcinoma in the solitary kidney." The Journal of Urology 132.3 (1984): 450–454.
Rajfer, J., et al. "Hormonal therapy of cryptorchidism." New England Journal of Medicine 314.8 (1986): 466–470.
Ehrlich, R. M. et al. "Laparoscopic Nephrectomy in a child: expanding horizons for laparoscopy in pediatric urology." Journal of Endourology 6.6 (1992): 463–465.
Ehrlich, R.M., A. Gershman, and G. Fuchs. "Laparoscopic vesicoureteroplasty in children: initial case reports.” Urology 43.2 (1994): 255–261.
Ehrlich, R.M., A. Gershman, and G. Fuchs. "Laparoscopic renal surgery in children." The Journal of Urology 151.3 (1994): 735–739.
Lesavoy, M. A., et al. "Long-term follow-up of total abdominal wall reconstruction for prune belly syndrome." Plastic and Reconstructive Surgery 129.1 (2012): 104e-109e.

Medical books
Smith R.B.H. and Ehrlich R.M.: Complications of Urologic Surgery: Prevention and Management, W.B. Saunders Company, Philadelphia, Pennsylvania, 1990.
Reconstructive and Plastic Surgery of the External Genitalia: Adult and Pediatric. W.B. Saunders Company, Philadelphia, Pennsylvania, 1999.

Photography books
Richard Ehrlich, Namibia: The Forbidden Zone, Nazraeli Press, Paso Robles, California, 2007.
Richard Ehrlich, Anatomia Digitale, Nazraeli Press, Paso Robles, California, 2009.
Richard Ehrlich, The Other Side of the Sky, Craig Krull Gallery, Santa Monica, California, 2014.
Richard Ehrlich, Reverie, Craig Krull Gallery and Weston Gallery, San Francisco, California, 2015.
Richard Ehrlich, Face the Music, Steidl, Göttingen, Germany, 2015.
Richard Ehrlich, Faces of Promise: Looking Beyond Autism, Graphic Arts Books, Berkeley, California, 2017.
Richard Ehrlich, Neogenesis Portfolio, Nazraeli Press, Paso Robles, California, 2017.
Tony Berlant, Evan Maurer & Julia Burtenshaw, Decoding Mimbres Painting: Ancient Ceramics of the American Southwest, Prestel Publishing, Munich, 2018. (Ehrlich served as the photographer)
Richard Ehrlich, What's Past Is Prologue: That Was Then, This Is Now, CDS Publications, Medford, Oregon, 2018.
Richard Ehrlich, Surface Aria: Inside the Outside, CDS Publications, Medford, Oregon, 2018.
Richard Ehrlich, Neogenesis Two, Edition One, Richmond, California, 2019.
Richard Ehrlich, Out of the Fire: Abstract Truth, Edition One, Richmond, California, 2019.
Richard Ehrlich, In Libris XI - Bibliophilia, CDS Publications, Medford, Oregon, 2020.
Richard Ehrlich, Neogenesis Three, CDS Publications, Medford, Oregon, 2020.
Richard Ehrlich, The Arolsen Holocaust Archive, Steidl, Göttingen, Germany, 2021.
Richard Ehrlich, Homage to Rothko: Abstract Sublime, Edition One, Richmond, California, 2021.
Richard Ehrlich, Ars Scientifica: What's the Big Idea?, CDS Publications, Medford, Oregon, 2022.
Richard Ehrlich, Mark Making: Taking a Line for a Walk, Edition One, Richmond, California, 2022.
Richard Ehrlich, Sequoia Reimagined, Edition One, Richmond, California, 2023

References

External links

USHMM Permanent Exhibition
OAC Inventory for Ehrlich's Holocaust Archive

American surgeons
1938 births
Living people
Fine art photographers
Weill Cornell Medical College alumni
Physicians from New York City
Photographers from New York City
20th-century American photographers
21st-century American photographers